Boom! Boom! The World Vs Boris Becker is a two-part 2023 documentary by Alex Gibney. It details the life of troubled tennis champion Boris Becker including exclusive access to three years of his life up to his incarceration in the United Kingdom in April 2022. It is a co-production between Ventureland and Jigsaw Productions, with financing from Lorton Entertainment. The documentary is set to be released in two parts on Apple TV+. The first part premiered at the 2023 Berlin Film Festival on 19 February, 2023.

Synopsis
Narrated by Gonley, the first part of the documentary details the precocious rise of Becker the tennis player from teenage Wimbledon champion to  becoming world number one. It concludes with the warning that the traits that drove Becker to tennis greatness would in turn also lead to his downfall, to be investigated in part two.

Cast
 Boris Becker
 Barbara Becker
 Ion Tiriac
 Bjorn Borg
 Novak Djokovic
 John McEnroe
 Lilian de Carvalho
 Mats Wilander
 Michael Stich
 Brad Gilbert
 Nick Bollettieri

Production
The project is a co-production between Ventureland and Jigsaw Productions, with financing from Lorton Entertainment and boasts exclusive access to Boris Becker over a three-year build-up to his prison sentencing in the UK courts for hiding assets and loans to avoid paying debt, in April 2022. The title is a nod to his "Boom Boom" nickname as a big-serving tennis player. Interviews in the documentary include Novak Djokovic, Ion Tiriac, John McEnroe and Bjorn Borg. Other talking heads include Michael Stich, Brad Gilbert and Nick Bollettieri.

Release
The first part premiered at the Berlin Film Festival on February 19, 2023. Both parts will be available to stream on Apple TV+ on April 7, 2023.

Reception
Kevin Maher in The Times gave the documentary a good review saying it was “fabulously paced, nicely shot, and with snappy, illuminating contributions from Borg, McEnroe and an unexpectedly wry Mats Wilander. Gibney also re-examines crucial career matches with revealing hindsight.”

References

External links

Documentary films about sports
American sports documentary films
Apple TV+ original films
British sports documentary films
Documentary films about sportspeople
Documentary films about criminals
2023 documentary films
Films directed by Alex Gibney